She Shot Me Down is a 1981 album by Frank Sinatra.

This was the final album Sinatra recorded for the record label he founded, Reprise Records, and generally considered an artistic triumph that evokes the best of Sinatra during this stage of his career. The album, however, was not a commercial success.

She Shot Me Down harks back to the triumphs of Sinatra's Capitol years, a thought-provoking set of torch songs with soaring strings, lyrics fraught with loss and regret, and heart-rending, world-weary vocals.

Of the recordings chosen for the album, the only remake of a previous recording by Sinatra himself was the medley of Harold Arlen's and Ira Gershwin's "The Gal that Got Away" with Rodgers and Hart's "It Never Entered My Mind" Sinatra would bring this medley to his concert set-list with much success, evident especially during the live concerts filmed in The Dominican Republic for Concert for the Americas. (Another remake was "She Shot Me Down," originally recorded by Sinatra on June 4, 1973 but, aside from appearing on bootleg records, this version was never officially released.)

Track listing
"Good Thing Going (Going Gone)" (Stephen Sondheim) – 3:53
"Hey Look, No Crying" (Jule Styne, Susan Birkenhead) – 5:27
"Thanks for the Memory" (Leo Robin, Ralph Rainger) – 4:25
"A Long Night" (Alec Wilder, Loonis McGlohon) – 3:44
"Bang Bang (My Baby Shot Me Down)" (Sonny Bono) – 3:24
"Monday Morning Quarterback" (Don Costa, Pamela Phillips-Oland) – 4:38
"South - To a Warmer Place" (Wilder, McGlohon) – 3:45
"I Loved Her" (Gordon Jenkins) – 4:04
Medley: "The Gal that Got Away"/"It Never Entered My Mind" (Harold Arlen, Ira Gershwin)/(Lorenz Hart, Richard Rodgers) – 5:50

Personnel
 Frank Sinatra - vocals
 Gordon Jenkins - arranger, conductor
 Don Costa - arranger, conductor
 Nelson Riddle - arranger
 Vincent Falcone, Jr - conductor

Recording dates
April 8, 1981 - "Bang Bang (My Baby Shot Me Down)", "The Gal that Got Away"/"It Never Entered My Mind"
July 20, 1981 - "Thanks for the Memory", "A Long Night", "I Loved Her"
July 21, 1981 - "South - To a Warmer Place"
August 19, 1981 - "Good Thing Going (Going Gone)"
September 10, 1981 - "Hey Look, No Cryin'", "Monday Morning Quarterback"

References

External links
 Entry at allmusic.com
 Entry at discogs.com

1981 albums
Frank Sinatra albums
Reprise Records albums
Albums produced by Don Costa
Albums arranged by Gordon Jenkins
Albums arranged by Don Costa
Albums arranged by Nelson Riddle